Save The Last Dance For Me is a jukebox musical written by Laurence Marks and Maurice Gran. It primarily uses songs from the 1960s written by Doc Pomus and Mort Shuman such as A Teenager in Love, Sweets For My Sweet, Little Sister, Viva Las Vegas, Can't Get Used to Losing You and the title song Save The Last Dance For Me. It opened at the Churchill Theatre Bromley on 9 January 2012 before embarking on a nationwide tour.  A spin-off production from Dreamboats and Petticoats, it reunited the writing team with producer Bill Kenwright and director Keith Strachan. The choreography was by Olivier Award winner, Bill Deamer. As was the case in Dreamboats and Petticoats, all of the music was played live by the actors on stage. A new production has been announced, due to open April 2016 at Windsor Theatre Royal, before touring the UK again.

Plot

In 1963, teen sisters Jennifer and Marie go on holiday to a caravan in Lowestoft without their parents. There they meet handsome American airman Milton who is stationed at a local airbase and invites the sisters to a dance at the base. At the dance youngest sister Marie meets and eventually falls in love with Curtis, a black airman from Tennessee. The story deals with themes of racial tension both in the American military and British society, as well as Anglo-American relations in the 1960s.

Music
The musical was advertised as featuring the hits of Doc Pomus & Mort Shuman and included many of their songs, although some songs were included that the duo did not write together and some songs, like Way Down Yonder in New Orleans, that were not written by either of them. A double CD compilation album was released in May 2012.

Cast

Reception

The critical reception was mixed, with many reviewers judging the storyline to be a weak point, while the cast and musicians' performances were often praised. It was often deemed inferior in comparison to Dreamboats and Petticoats. Catherine Jones of the Liverpool Echo described the plot as "purely a vehicle to introduce the American songwriters’ extensive back catalogue", while Phil Williams of the North Wales Pioneer called the show "unmissable", "sheer quality" with "excellent musicians". Bruce Blacklaw of The Scotsman was particularly scathing, and referred to the use of "cack-handed race and gender politics", with "all the depth of a burst paddling pool", although he conceded that the show was about the music and that the audience were dancing in the aisles.

References

External links
Official website 

Fiction set in 1963
2012 musicals
Jukebox musicals
British musicals